Tulak District is located in the southwestern part of the Ghor province, Afghanistan. It is a mountainous district like the whole province. The population is 103,612 and the district center is Kwajaha.

The Nalbandon zinc-lead deposit is located in the district. According to a study by the German Geological Mission, the reserves were estimated to be 130,000 tons of zinc and 12,000 tons of lead.

References

External links 
 Map of Settlements IMMAP, September 2011

Districts of Ghor Province